Ravi Teja is an Indian film actor and producer who predominantly works in Telugu cinema. He is known for his roles in action comedy films. He is one of the highest-paid actors in the Telugu film industry. He has won three state Nandi Awards and one Filmfare Award South. He is popularly known by the moniker "Mass Maharaja".

He first appeared in an uncredited role in the 1990 film Karthavyam, and played minor or uncredited roles in many films such as Allari Priyudu (1993), Ninne Pelladata (1996). Then, he appeared in meatier supporting roles in films like Sindhooram (1997), Manasichi Choodu (1998), Premaku Velayara (1999), Samudram (1999), Annayya (2000) among others throughout the '90s. He also worked as an assistant director for several films.

His debut in a lead role came in the 1999 film Nee Kosam which was an average grosser at the box office. But his performance in the film earned him the Nandi Special Jury Award. He subsequently became an established lead actor through the films Itlu Sravani Subramanyam (2001), Avunu Valliddaru Ista Paddaru! (2002), and Idiot (2002) which became commercially successful.

He then went onto star in notable films like Khadgam (2002), Amma Nanna O Tamila Ammayi (2003), Venky (2004), Naa Autograph (2004), Bhadra (2005), Vikramarkudu (2006), Dubai Seenu (2007), Krishna (2008), Neninthe (2008), Kick (2009), Sambho Siva Sambho (2010), Don Seenu (2010), Mirapakay (2011), Balupu (2013), Power (2014), Bengal Tiger (2015), Raja the Great (2017), Krack (2021), Dhamaka (2022) and  Waltair Veerayya (2023).

He owns a production company named RT Team Works.

Film

As an actor

 All films are in Telugu, unless otherwise noted

As a producer

As a singer

Notes

References

Indian filmographies
Male actor filmographies